Federal Highway 119 (Carretera Federal 119) is a Federal Highway of Mexico. Federal Highway 119 is split into two segments: the first segment travels from Tejocotal, Hidalgo in the north to Apizaco, Tlaxcala in the south. The second segment travels from Tlaxcala City in the north to Puebla City in the south.

References

119